The 2005 WNBA season was the Monarch’s ninth season. The Monarchs finished the season by winning their first WNBA Championship.

Offseason

WNBA Draft

Regular season

Season standings

Season schedule

Player stats
Note: GP = Games played; REB = Rebounds; AST = Assists; STL = Steals; BLK = Blocks; PTS = Points

Playoffs

Awards and honors
Yolanda Griffith, WNBA Finals MVP Award
 Nicole Powell, WNBA Most Improved Player Award
 John Whisenant, WNBA Coach of the Year Award

References

Monarchs on Basketball Reference

External links

Sacramento Monarchs seasons
Sacramento
Sacramento Monarchs
Western Conference (WNBA) championship seasons
Women's National Basketball Association championship seasons